Jeunesse Sportive Madinet Tiaret, known as JSM Tiaret or simply JSMT for short, is an Algerian football club based in Tiaret, Algeria. The club was founded on 1943 and its colours are blue and white. Their home stadium, Ahmed Kaïd Stadium, has a capacity of 14,000 spectators. The club is currently playing in the Algerian Ligue 2.

History
The club was founded on 7 April 1943 under the name of Jeunesse Sportive Musulmane de Tiaret.

On August 5, 2020, JSM Tiaret promoted to the Algerian Ligue 2.

Honours
Algerian Ligue 1
Third place (1): 1987–88
Algerian Ligue 2
Champions (3): 1969–70, 1983–84, 1986–87

Current squad

References

External links
http://www.jsmtiaret.sitew.com 

 
Football clubs in Algeria
Association football clubs established in 1943
Jsm Tiaret
1943 establishments in Algeria
Sports clubs in Algeria